Astragalus acutirostris is a species of milkvetch known by the common name sharpkeel milkvetch. It is native to the Mojave Desert and surroundings of California, Nevada, and Arizona, where it grows in dry, sandy, gravelly areas.

Description
Astragalus acutirostris is an annual legume growing a hairy reddish stem no more than 30 centimeters long along the ground or slightly upright. The small leaves are made up of several pairs of small oblong leaflets, each less than a centimeter long and often with notched tips. The inflorescence contains one to six white or pinkish-tinted pealike flowers, each with a banner that curves back.

The fruit is a slightly curved, narrow legume pod 1 to 3 centimeters long. The pod is thin-walled and coated sparsely in white hairs like the rest of the plant.

References

External links
Jepson Manual - Astragalus acutirostris
USDA Plants Profile: Astragalus acutirostris
Astragalus acutirostris - Photo gallery

acutirostris
Flora of Nevada
Flora of Arizona
Flora of the California desert regions
Plants described in 1885
Flora without expected TNC conservation status